Spirits is a Philippine television program that was released by ABS-CBN. It aired from December 6, 2004, to May 6, 2005, replacing It Might Be You and was replaced by Mga Anghel na Walang Langit. It also aired on Wednesdays at 9:45pm on Jeepney TV. It is about eight children: Red, Lloyd, Maya, Liz, Jessie, Thor, Nato, and Gabby, who find out one day that they have special abilities unlike normal humans, which they received when a strange epidemic hit their hometown.

Intended to be a prequel to director Chito S. Roño's Spirit Warriors films, Spirits was Roño's television debut, though he had already directed several films.

Synopsis
One day in 1993, a small town is hit by an unknown supernatural epidemic, which only affected children. About a week after the sickness hit, almost every toddler and child in town was affected, and the town hospital was full of children. The same night, the evening sky started to change colors, into a mix of pink, red, and purple. A few hours after the sky changed, a pregnant lady was taken to the hospital, unaware that the baby that she was carrying was an alien. An unknown man knew about the alien, and went to the hospital to kill it, which would mean also killing the mother. The man entered the emergency room, but too late. The alien was born and just as he entered the room, the alien released a bright light in the hospital which killed almost all the children there. The only ones who survived were eight children and the adults.

Cast and characters
According to the plot, the world was composed by three different groups: Mortal, Immortals, and Elementals.

Mortals
Mortals are the group of simple people. Some have powers.

List of Mortals in the Story:

 Red (Rayver Cruz) – the group's de facto leader, and the first of the teens to consider banding together to figure out why there are many "gifted" kids in town. He and six of his friends, who are the most powerful of the "gifted" kids, form the Camera Club. He possesses the power of telekinesis and eventually, later in the series, gained the ability to levitate.
 Gabby (Maja Salvador) – The school's classic overachiever whose sunny ways ensure she is liked by everyone she meets. She is the object of Red's and Lloyd's affections and spends much of the series torn between them. She does not possess any powers.
 Lloyd (John Wayne Sace) – Who can see and communicate with the dead as clearly as the living. In the latter part of the series, as part of the characters' power "upgrades", he is able to project a corporeal double of himself, and later of others.
 Nato (Jiro Manio) – The descendant of a long line of healers who now struggles with his gift of speaking with enchanted creatures, usually duwendes (dwarves). He gains the power of the third eye which enables him to see through illusions. He also gains the power of a gatekeeper and is able to jump between different realms.
 Liz (Serena Dalrymple) – A mind-reader who eventually realizes that the "curse" for reading other people's thoughts is really a gift. Her power eventually grows, enabling her to control minds.
 Thor (Mico Aytona) – The easy-go-lucky class clown who joins the Camera Club for his own not-quite-honest reasons. Though lacking any power, he has helped his friends through many of their adventures and is also ready to help when needed.
 Maya (Michelle Madrigal) – Maya is an empath, a psychic who can sense, understand and absorb another person's emotions and can see the past of anything or anyone through her touch even if that other person is not in the same room (a form of clairvoyance). Maya's powers later improve and she is able to project feelings through her hands, which she has used to inadvertently cause boils to appear on someone's skin.
 Jessie (Joseph Bitangcol) – A more dangerous power lies within resident rebel Jessie, who is Lloyd's cousin, who finds out he can start fires with just his mind. As part of the characters' power "upgrade," he is able to control and manipulate fire
 Kuya Dong (Jhong Hilario) – The school's resident maintenance man and Nato's uncle. He is the only one who knows about Brita and her true plan. He hopes to stop her on his own in order to protect the kids and prevent Brita's rise to power.

Immortals
Immortal are creatures that cannot die.

 Taga-sundo (Death) (Ku Aquino) – The most hated being in the Engkanto's world. He is the series' first villain after he abducted Gabby while in their homeworld. But towards the end of the series, he became an ally because he was forced by Prinsipe Dumala in order to end the chaos that is happening.
 Pighati (Pain) (Glenda Garcia) – Taga-sundo's Sister. If Pain and Death touched each other, One of them is going to die.
 Taga-Bantay (The Protector) (Lito Pimentel) – The one who protects the three enchanted stones that completes the reborn of the darkness.
 Taga-tala (The Prophet) (Joji Isla) – An old hermit-like adviser to Prinsipe Dumala that writes every certain event of the history. He holds the key to finding out how to defeat the First Evil.

Elementals
Elementals are those who are supernatural and enchanted creatures.
 Prinsipe Dumala (Danilo Barrios) – The prince of Engkantos, He disguised as a human because he likes Gabby and even invited her to his kingdom; Dumala's intentions with her are honorable and intended to return Gabby to the human world in due time; however, her friends thinking otherwise led to Red and Lloyd following her to the world of the world of the Engkantos. But later, the prince became an ally throughout the last episode and helped the kids in order to stop the greatest threat that is to yet to come.
 Bakshi – An elf friend of Nato and Dong and Mang Jose, Dong and Nato's Father told him to look after them.
 Sola (Kristine Jaca) – A disguiser. She disguised as Gabby while Gabby was still with the Taga-sundo, so that the people will not worry about Gabby.

Mga Taong Araw – Red and Lloyd meet them when they were travelling to save Gabby in the World of Elementals. Taong Araws works and give fun to Prinsipe Dumala.

 Bughaw (Janus del Prado) – A taong araw who is the eldest of the siblings, who dislikes Red and Lloyd when they entered their troupe.
 Luntian (Ronaliza Cheng) – A taong araw who is the youngest of the siblings, she helped Red and Lloyd when they were still in the troupe.
 Kahel (Mike Agassi) - A taong araw who is the middle of the siblings, in the first place he hates Red and Lloyd while in their troupe, but later on appreciates them because of an injury that Red and Lloyd saved Luntian in the spear attack in the field.

Mga Diwata (Fairies) – They helped Red, Lloyd and Jessie to go to the World of Elementals.

 Diwatang Tubig (Cherry Lou) -–Fairy of water.
 Diwatang Apoy (Jenny Miller) – Fairy of fire.
 Diwatang Hangin (Assunta de Rossi) – Fairy of air.

Mga Mangkukulam (Witches)

 Brita/ Lupe (Lotlot de Leon) – Lloyd's mother and Jessie's aunt and the series' antagonist. She is dead as the series starts, but still regularly talks to Lloyd. He hopes to use Lloyd to do her bidding. Though motherly at first, her true goal is to finish what she started: to collect the "gifted" kids in town and sacrifice them in order to gain more power and to live.
 Leader of Mangkukulams (Bella Flores) – Brita's aunt and leader of the group of mangkukulams.

Other characters
 Ricky Davao – Red's dad
 Sandy Andolong as Paz – Red's mom
 Marjorie Barretto as Marita – Gabby's mom
 Cris Villanueva – Liz's dad
 Ilonah Jean – Maya's mom
 Allyson Lualhati – Lloyd's ghost friend
 Miles Ocampo – Grace, Gabby's sister
 Efren Reyes Jr. – Police Chief Jaime, Jessie's step-dad
 Nica Peralejo
 Helga Krapf
 Diego Castro – Harvey
 Blair Arellano
 Glaiza de Castro – Pinky
 Minnie Aguilar
 Dexter Doria – school principal
 Nash Aguas – Young Red
 Miguel Vera
 My-My Davao
 Liza Lorena - as Red's Lola
 Ching Arellano

Broadcast
The show re-aired on Studio 23 (now S+A) in 2005 and on the Kapamilya Channel (now S+A International) in 2007. On August 13, 2021, the official Youtube channel of Jeepney TV started uploading full episodes of the series.

Reception
The drama received mixed reviews from TV viewers and critics. Its highest rating was 37.4%, the lowest was 20.5% and an average of 24.9% in the Mega Manila ratings as the Nationwide ratings were still occasional and not yet available daily.

Remake
A remake directed by Topel Lee and produced by GMO Entertainment Unit titled Spirits: Reawaken was announced for ABS-CBN's iWant streaming service. It will be set in the 90s and follows six teenagers with supernatural powers as they protect Earth from an alien invasion.

Spirits: Reawaken stars Grae Fernandez as Red, Jairus Aquino as Jesse, Bugoy Cariño as Nato, Kira Balinger as Maya, Chantal Videla as Gabbie and Patrick Quiroz as Lloyd. The series began streaming on November 17, 2018.

See also
 List of programs broadcast by ABS-CBN
 Spirit Warriors
 Spirit Warriors: The Shortcut

References

External links
 

2004 Philippine television series debuts
2005 Philippine television series endings
ABS-CBN drama series
Television series about teenagers
Television series by Star Creatives
Fantaserye and telefantasya
Philippine horror fiction television series
Filipino-language television shows
Television shows set in the Philippines